Henri Desrivières (ca 1805 – November 12, 1865) was a seigneur and political figure in Canada East. He represented Verchères in the Legislative Assembly of the Province of Canada in 1841.

The son of François Desrivières, he acquired the seigneury of Montarville with François-Pierre Bruneau in 1819. Desrivières took part in the Lower Canada Rebellion but was never arrested. From 1836 to 1840, he served as judge in the court of special sessions of the peace; he also was prefect for Missisquoi County. Desrivières married Marie-Angélique Hay. He resigned his seat in 1841 to allow James Leslie to run for a seat in the assembly. He died at Stanbridge.

References 
 

Year of birth uncertain
1865 deaths
Members of the Legislative Assembly of the Province of Canada from Canada East
People from Montérégie